Mount Narryer is a mountain in Western Australia.

Situated along the Murchison River, the mountain is surrounded by mulga scrubland.

Mount Narryer is within the boundaries of Mount Narryer Station, which was established in about 1880.

Tiny fragments of zircon collected from Mount Narryer and the nearby Jack Hills have been dated at over four billion years old.

See also
List of ranches and stations

References

Shire of Murchison
Narryer